Rapenburg is a neighbourhood in Amsterdam, Netherlands. The main street is also called Rapenburg. Rapenburg is located in the centre of Amsterdam, on the northeastern side, close to the IJ. Rapenburg was first built in the sixteenth century and was home to many shipmakers, due to its location near to the IJ and the River Amstel.

Streets in Amsterdam
Neighbourhoods of Amsterdam